José Luis Benavidez Jr. (born May 15, 1992) is an American professional boxer, currently fighting at welterweight. He is the son of boxing trainer José Benavidez Sr. of Arcelia, Guerrero, Mexico.

Early life
Benavidez was born in Panorama City, California. His younger brother David Benavidez is also a professional boxer. In August 2016 he was shot in Phoenix while walking his cat.

Amateur career
Benavidez Jr. was an eleven time national champion, which include the Silver Gloves twice, qualifying for the Junior Olympics and earning a spot on the U.S. National Team, en route to a gaudy 120-5 amateur record. Benavidez is also the 2009 National Golden Gloves Champion in the light welterweight division, making him the youngest ever Golden Gloves Champion at only sixteen years old. He then reached the USA Boxing National Championship's title fight in Denver by beating the 2010 National Golden Gloves Champion Gary Allen Russell. He would lose the final on points 11-9 to Frankie Gómez.

Professional career

Benavidez Jr vs. Crawford 
On 13 october, 2018, Benavidez Jr fought the unbeaten Terence Crawford for his WBO welterweight title, in what was the first title of fight of his career. Benavidez Jr put up a good fight, but was ultimately overmatched by Crawford and lost the bout via TKO in the final round.

Benavidez Jr vs. Torres 
In his next bout, Benavidez Jr fought Francisco Emanuel Torres. The bout ended in a majority draw, with one judge seeing Benavidez Jr as the winner, scoring it 96-94, while the other two scored it 95-95.

Benavidez Jr vs. Garcia 
In his next bout, Benavidez Jr fought former champion and WBC #5 super welterweight Danny Garcia. Garcia beat Jose Benavidez by majority decision, with the scorecards announced as 116-112, 117-111, 114-114 in favor of Garcia.

Professional boxing record

See also
List of boxing families

References

External links

Jose Benavidez Jr - Profile, News Archive & Current Rankings at Box.Live

1992 births
Living people
American male boxers
Boxers from Arizona
Boxers from Los Angeles
People from Panorama City, Los Angeles
American boxers of Mexican descent
Light-welterweight boxers
National Golden Gloves champions